Rozbitek  is a village in the administrative district of Gmina Kwilcz, within Międzychód County, Greater Poland Voivodeship, in west-central Poland.

Rozbitek Castle and Park is currently owned by Oscar - Winning composer Jan A.P. Kaczmarek

References

Villages in Międzychód County